Adolf Dux (25 October 1822, Pozsony – 20 November 1881, Budapest) was a Hungarian Jewish writer and journalist.

A cousin of Leopold Dukes, Dux studied law and philosophy at the University of Vienna, and was connected with the Pressburger Zeitung until 1855, when he became a correspondent for Pester Lloyd. He translated Sándor Petőfi's and Josef Eötvös' Hungarian poetry, and Katona's tragedy, Bank Ban. He  wrote Aus Ungarn as well as various stories in German under the title Deutsch-Ungarisches.

References
 
 Profile, bartleby.com; accessed November 10, 2016.

1822 births
1881 deaths
Hungarian journalists
Hungarian translators
Hungarian writers in German
Hungarian Jews
Writers from Bratislava
19th-century journalists
Male journalists
19th-century translators
19th-century Hungarian male writers